Shivpuri may refer to:

Places
 Shivpuri, Patna, a neighborhood of Patna, India
 Shivpuri colony, one of the popular residential developments in Indranagar
 Shivpuri district, in Madhya Pradesh, India
 Shivpuri National Park, another name for Madhav National Park
 Shivpuri (Vidhan Sabha constituency)
 Shivpuri, the city seat of Shivpuri district
 Shivpuri, 18km Rishikesh on Badrinath highway
 Shivpuri, Lucknow, a village in Uttar Pradesh, India

People
 Himani Shivpuri (born 1960), Indian actress
 Malavika Shivpuri, Indian voice and film actress
 Om Shivpuri (died 1990), Indian actor
 Ritu Shivpuri (born 1975), Indian film actress and model
 Sudha Shivpuri (1937–2015), Indian actress (born 1937)

Other 
 R v Shivpuri, a House of Lords case in English law